Mehmet Erdem (born 1978) is a Turkish musician and singer-songwriter.

Life and career 
Mehmet Erdem was born in 1978 in Manisa. His family is originally from Arapgir. He studied at the İzmir Science High School  and later graduated from Boğaziçi University with a degree in mechanical engineering. His father was a clarinetist, and his maternal uncle played bağlama and this encouraged him to become a musician. He first played mandolin at the age of 5. He later started playing bağlama and cümbüş. While at high school, he joined several bands both as a musician and a vocalist.

In 1997, he moved to Istanbul to continue his studies and worked as a musician in different places. In 1999, he joined the Kardeş Türküler band and started a professional career. He then worked as a crew member during the production process for the studio albums of various artists. At the same time, he continued to learn oud, cümbüş, guitar, and bağlama from prominent musicians. Erdem also worked as a composer on the soundtrack of a number of movies and TV series. In 2009, for his score to the film Deli Deli Olma, starring Tarık Akan and Şerif Sezer, he won the Golden Orange award for Best Original Score. Aside from his career as a musician, he has made guest appearances in TV series and movies such as Leyla ile Mecnun, Kuzey Güney, Behzat Ç. Bir Ankara Polisiyesi and Deliha 2.

In October 2015, Erdem was sentenced to 10 months in prison for "using drugs" according to the decision of the Istanbul 19th High Criminal Court. He was acquitted of "establishing, managing and being a member of a drug ring". The court postponed the sentence as the prison sentence was less than a year.

Discography

Albums 
 Herkes Aynı Hayatta (2012)
 Hiç Konuşmadan (2013)
 Hepsi Benim Yüzünden (2016)
 Neden Böyleyiz (2018)
 Bir Şarkı Vardı Ya (2022)

Singles 
 "Allah'tan Kork" (with Aşkın Nur Yengi) (2019)
 "Deliler" (Yeni Türkü Zamansız) (2022)
 "Turnaların Göçü" (Musa Eroğlu ile Bir Asır 2) (2022)

Soundtracks 
 Polis - (2006)
 Dol - (2007)
 Sınıf - (2008)
 İş Arıyoruz - (2008)
 Deli Deli Olma - (2009)
 Sizi Seviyorum - (2009)
 Memleket Meselesi - (2010)
 Avrupa Avrupa - (2011)
 Leyla ile Mecnun - (2011)
 Vücut - (2011)
 Çalgı Çengi - (2011)
 Kalbim Seni Seçti - (2011)
 Aşk Kırmızı - (2013)
 Sen Aydınlatırsın Geceyi - (2013)
 Cenaze İşleri - (2017)

Awards

References

External links 

 

Living people
1978 births
Boğaziçi University alumni
Turkish singer-songwriters
Turkish male singers
People from Manisa
Musicians from Istanbul